National Tertiary Route 928, or just Route 928 (or ) is a National Road Route of Costa Rica, located in the Guanacaste province.

Description
In Guanacaste province the route covers Santa Cruz canton (Veintisiete de Abril district).

References

Highways in Costa Rica